Chris Davis (born November 18, 1982) is a retired American mixed martial artist. A professional from 2008 until 2013, he fought in Bellator.

Background
Born and raised in Alabama, Davis is a former Marine.

Mixed martial arts career

Early career
A professional mixed martial artist since 2008, Davis spent the majority of his earlier fights is smaller organizations, where he would face the likes of Jeremy Horn and Vinny Magalhães. By April 23, 2010, Davis had compiled a record of 10 wins and 2 losses.

Bellator Fighting Championships
Davis signed with Bellator in February 2011. Davis took part in the Season Four Light Heavyweight Tournament Quarterfinal at Bellator 38 against Christian M'Pumbu. He lost the fight via TKO at 3:34 in round 3.

Over a year later, Davis would return to the Bellator cage when he faced seasoned veteran Travis Wiuff at Bellator 71. Davis lost the fight via TKO in the first round.

Independent promotions
After his short stint in Bellator, Davis faced William Hill at Rogue Warrior Championships 3 on September 6, 2012. Davis lost the fight via TKO in the first round.

Davis next faced Teddy Holder at Strike Hard Productions 28 on August 10, 2013. Davis lost the fight via TKO in the first round, marking Davis' fourth consecutive loss via form of TKO.

Personal life
Davis currently works as a Public Adjuster for the Noble Public Adjusting Group.

Mixed martial arts record

|-
| Loss
|align=center| 10–6
|Terry Holder
|TKO (punches)
| Strike Hard Productions 28
|
|align=center| 1
|align=center| 3:18
|Birmingham, Alabama, United States
|
|-
| Loss
|align=center| 10–5
|William Hill
|TKO (punches)
| Rogue Warrior Championships 3
|
|align=center| 1
|align=center| 4:46
| Green Bay, Wisconsin
|
|-
| Loss
|align=center| 10–4
|Travis Wiuff
|TKO (punches)
| Bellator 71
|
|align=center| 1
|align=center| 4:19
| Chester, West Virginia
|
|-
| Loss
|align=center| 10–3
|Christian M'Pumbu
| TKO (punches)
| Bellator 38
| 
|align=center| 3
|align=center| 3:34
| Tunica, Mississippi, United States
| 
|-
| Win
|align=center| 10–2
|Francisco France
| KO (punches)
| Empire Fighting Championships: A Night of Reckoning 3
| 
|align=center| 2
|align=center| 3:27
| Tunica, Mississippi, United States
| 
|-
| Win
|align=center| 9–2
|Kendrick Watkins
| TKO (punches)
| Rumble at Raxx 7
| 
|align=center| 1
|align=center| 1:05
| Louisiana, United States
| 
|-
| Win
|align=center| 8–2
|Brian Imes
| TKO (punches)
| 5150 Combat League / Xtreme Fighting League: New Year's Revolution
| 
|align=center| 1
|align=center| 2:22
| Tulsa, Oklahoma, United States
| 
|-
| Loss
|align=center| 7–2
|Vinny Magalhães
| Submission (triangle choke)
| CFP: Carolina Crown 2
| 
|align=center| 1
|align=center| 1:13
| Raleigh, North Carolina, United States
| 
|-
| Win
|align=center| 7–1
|Chris Bell
| Submission (armbar)
| Rumble at Raxx 6
| 
|align=center| 1
|align=center| 0:58
| Louisiana, United States
| 
|-
| Win
|align=center| 6–1
|Chris Bell
| Submission (armbar)
| Cajun Fighting Championships
| 
|align=center| 1
|align=center| 2:03
| Lafayette, Louisiana, United States
| 
|-
| Loss
|align=center| 5–1
|Jeremy Horn
| Submission (rear-naked choke)
| Adrenaline MMA 3: Bragging Rights
| 
|align=center| 1
|align=center| 4:17
| Birmingham, Alabama, United States
| 
|-
| Win
|align=center| 5–0
|Brett Chism
| Submission (armbar)
| DPP: Blood, Sweat & Victory
| 
|align=center| 1
|align=center| 1:10
| Columbus, Georgia, United States
| 
|-
| Win
|align=center| 4–0
|Brad Rinehart
| TKO (punches)
| Rumble at Raxx 4
| 
|align=center| 1
|align=center| 1:06
| Louisiana, United States
| 
|-
| Win
|align=center| 3–0
|Donavin Hawkey
| Submission (armbar)
| XFC 6: Clash of the Continents
| 
|align=center| 1
|align=center| 3:58
| Tampa, United States
| 
|-
| Win
|align=center| 2–0
|Mike Perez
| Submission (rear-naked choke)
| Rumble at Raxx 3
| 
|align=center| 1
|align=center| 1:18
| Louisiana, United States
| 
|-
| Win
|align=center| 1–0
|Patrick Mandio
| TKO (doctor stoppage)
| EFN: Gadsden Extreme Fight Night
| 
|align=center| 2
|align=center| 5:00
| Gadsden, Alabama, United States
|

References

External links
 

American male mixed martial artists
Living people
1982 births
Sportspeople from Gadsden, Alabama